Gustav Georg Embden (10 November 1874 – 25 July 1933) was a German physiological chemist.

Background
Gustav Embden was a son of the Hamburg lawyer and politician George Heinrich Embden. His grandmother Charlotte Heine was a well-known salonnière and a sister of the poet Heinrich Heine.

Education and career 
Embden initially studied in Freiburg, Strasbourg, Munich, Berlin, and Zurich under the famous physiologists of his time, including Johannes von Kries, Franz Hofmeister, Gaule, Paul Ehrlich, and Julius Richard Ewald. In 1904, he became the director of the chemistry laboratory of the medical clinic at the Frankfurt-Sachsenhausen municipal hospital. His research here helped to build the clinic into the Physiological Institute by 1907 and into the University Institute for Vegetative Physiology in 1914. In the same year, he retained his directorship and started teaching at the University of Frankfurt am Main. Embden served as the rector of the university from 1925 to 1926.

Research 
Embden conducted studies on carbohydrate metabolism and muscle contraction, and he was the first to discover and link together all the steps involved in the conversion of glycogen to lactic acid. In 1918, Otto Fritz Meyerhof's work on cellular metabolism showed that the process involved the breakdown of glucose to lactic acid. Embden is known for having worked out the precise steps involved in this breakdown. Henceforth, this cellular metabolic sequence from glycogen to lactic acid became known as the Embden–Meyerhof pathway.

Embden had also worked on developing a technique to prevent tissue damage. In doing so, he discovered the liver's role in metabolic processes, thereby laying a foundation for understanding normal sugar metabolism and of its pathological form, diabetes.

Some scientific historians, such as Thomas Kuhn, consider the work done in the 1930s in the laboratories of Meyerhof, Parnas, Embden, Warburg, etc. to be the mark of a true scientific revolution.

Awards 
Although Embden was never awarded a Nobel prize, he was nominated 12 times over 8 years.

References

1874 births
1933 deaths
20th-century German chemists
People educated at the Wilhelm-Gymnasium (Hamburg)
Scientists from Hamburg
Academic staff of Goethe University Frankfurt
Members of the Royal Society of Sciences in Uppsala